Amargosa is an unincorporated community and census-designated place in Jim Wells County, Texas, United States. Its population was 291 at the 2010 census. Prior to 2010, the community was grouped with nearby Owl Ranch as part of the Owl Ranch-Amargosa census-designated place. The community is named for the Amargosa Creek that runs nearby. The word amargosa means "bitter" in Spanish.

Geography

Education
It is within the Alice Independent School District. The district operates Alice High School.

References

Unincorporated communities in Jim Wells County, Texas
Unincorporated communities in Texas
Census-designated places in Jim Wells County, Texas
Census-designated places in Texas